Kätlin Tammiste (born April 6, 1996) is an Estonian competitive sailor. She and Anna Maria Sepp placed 19th in the 49erFX event at the 2016 Summer Olympics.

References

1996 births
Living people
Estonian female sailors (sport)
Olympic sailors of Estonia
Sailors at the 2016 Summer Olympics – 49er FX